Maine mac Cearbhall, great grandson of Niall of the Nine Hostages, died 531 or 538. The brother of Diarmait mac Cerbaill, future High King of Ireland. Maine's great grandfather was Niall of the Nine Hostages, making Maine an Ui Neill. Maine's descendants according to the Book of Ballymote were called Cenel Maine.

Career

Prof. Byrnes writes "In 538 Diarmait mac Cerbaill’s brother Maine (the coincidence of his name is quite fortuitous) was defeated and slain at the battle of Claenloch near Gort in south Galway. According to the Annals of Tigernach, a Clonmacnoise compilation, he was slain by the king of the Ui Fiachrach Aidne, Goibnenn mac Conaill, while attempting to claim the claim the homage of the Ui Maine Connacht. In the later king-lists Maine mac Cerbaill is called king of Uisnech. In the minds of compilers this meant that he was over-king of the Southern Ui Neill, but this is probably an anachronism, especially since Tuathal Maelgarb is supposed to have been high-king of Tara at this date."

Book of Ballymote

Fergus cerrbel .ui. mc. leis .i. Fiach a quo .H. Fhiaich Maine a quo Cenel Maine & Garban a quo .H. Garban la firu Breagh. Diarmaid (.i. mc. Fergusa Cerbel) .iiii. mc. leis .i. Colman mor, Colman beg, Aedh slane, Maelduin o fuilet Muinter Maelduin i Cluain mc. Nois.

A.D. 531

The Annals of the Four Masters (who list his death sub anno 531), state:

Cath Claonlocha h-i c-Cenel Aodha ria n-Goibhneann, taoisioch Ua Fiachrach Aidhne, airm in ro marbhadh Maine, mac Cerbhaill, ag cosnamh geillsine Ua Maine Connacht.

The battle of Claenloch, in Cinel Aedh, by Goibhneann, chief of Ui Fiachrach Aidhne, where Maine, son of Cearbhall, was killed, in defending the hostages of Ui Maine of Connaught.

Claenloch is now thought to be Coole Lough, a turlough located at Coole Park, County Galway.

References

 Annals of Ulster at CELT: Corpus of Electronic Texts at University College Cork
 Annals of Tigernach at CELT: Corpus of Electronic Texts at University College Cork
Revised edition of McCarthy's synchronisms at Trinity College Dublin.
 Byrne, Francis John (2001), Irish Kings and High-Kings, Dublin: Four Courts Press, 

People from County Galway
People from County Roscommon
6th-century Irish monarchs
530s deaths
Year of birth unknown
Kings of Uí Maine